Dejana Milosavljević (born 23 November 1994) is a Croatian female handball player for Siófok KC and the Croatian national team.

She participated at the 2018 European Women's Handball Championship.

References

External links

Living people
1994 births
Croatian female handball players
People from Požega, Croatia
ŽRK Zamet players
RK Podravka Koprivnica players
21st-century Croatian women